Michael McBride (born 20 January 1982) is a Gaelic footballer who plays for the Derry county team, with whom he has won a National League title. He plays his club football for St Colm's Ballinascreen. For both club and county he usually plays in the half back line. His brother Dermot has also played on occasion for Derry.

Playing career

Inter-county
McBride was a substitute on the Derry panel that finished runners-up to Tyrone in the 2005 Dr McKenna Cup. He was later called up to the Derry panel during the 2007 Championship for cover, but did not play in any games. He worked his way into the Derry team in the 2008 McKenna Cup (where Derry again reached the final) and the 2008 National League, which Derry won defeating Kerry in the final. He made his Championship debut later that year in the defeat to Monaghan.

Details of Championship matches

A.  Result column lists Derry's score first
Statistics accurate as of 19 January 2009

Club

McBride won a Derry ACFL Division 2 title with Ballinacreen in 2008, promoting the club back into Division 1.

Honours

Inter-county
National Football League:
Winner (1): 2008
Dr McKenna Cup:
Runner up: 2005, 2008

Club
Derry ACFL Division 2:
Winner (1): 2008

Individual
Ballinascreen Player of the Season: 2007 (Joint winner with Dermot McBride)
Ballinascreen captain: 2007

Note: The above lists may be incomplete. Please add any other honours you know of.

References

External links
Player profiles on Official Derry GAA website
St Colm's GAC Ballinascreen Website

1982 births
Living people
Ballinascreen Gaelic footballers
Derry inter-county Gaelic footballers